Tsunao Okumura (奥村 綱雄 Okumura Tsunao; 5 March 1903 - 7 November 1972) was the president of Nomura Securities between 1948 - 1959.  He was seen as the king of Japanese stockbroking in the 1950s.

As the son of a wealthy confectioner, Okumura showed little ambition from a young age.  At nineteen, he entered Kyoto University where he enjoyed the softer pleasures offered to a well-to-do college student.  His father gave him 100 yen a month spending money, at a time when twenty yen was enough to enjoy a very comfortable lifestyle.  Taking his classes lightly, he spent much time in Kyoto's dance halls along with other rich young men.  Okumura left university without impressive grades and was rejected by the Mitsubishi, Mitsui , and Yamaguchi banks.  He succeeded in entering Nomura's research department with a personal introduction.

Early career
His colleagues observed that Tsunao Okumura was pleasant and self-assured but lacked the hunger that characterized other Nomura executives.  He often came to work late, was despondent, and left early.  Shortly after joining Nomura, his parents arranged for him to marry the eldest daughter of a wealthy Osaka landowner.  His marriage into wealth further discouraged his ambition.

In 1935, Okumura made a serious error that nearly cost him his career.  As a research analyst in marketing, Okumura published a secret book for investors espousing the merits of purchasing overseas bonds.  At the time, the Bank of Japan prohibited the purchase of overseas bonds by the Japanese.  Japan needed all the money it could get to expand its military.  Bank of Japan officials found out about the brochure and consequently reprimanded the then-president of Nomura securities, Otogo Kataoka.  Kataoka furiously ordered Okumura's resignation but was persuaded by other senior colleagues to simply demote Okumura instead.  Disgraced, Okumura was transferred to the registration section.  The registration section, where only women worked, involved hand numbering every security as it was bought and sold.  The only compensation for Okumura there was that the women spoiled him shamelessly.

Comeback
Later on, Okumura's book on purchasing overseas bonds put him back in favor with Nomura's senior management, sending his career on an upward path.

References
 The House of Nomura, Al Alletzhauser, Bloomsbury Publishing Limited

External links
Funding Universe: Nomura Securities Company, Limited

20th-century Japanese businesspeople
People from Shiga Prefecture
Kyoto University alumni
1903 births
1972 deaths
Nomura Holdings